Dunstan Luka Kitandula (born 14 October 1967) is a Tanzanian CCM politician and Member of Parliament for Mkinga constituency since 2010.

References

1967 births
Living people
Chama Cha Mapinduzi MPs
Tanzanian MPs 2010–2015
Same Secondary School alumni
Galanos Secondary School alumni
Alumni of the University of Sunderland